Rubus tygartensis is a rare North American species of flowering plants in the rose family. It has been found only in West Virginia in the east-central United States.

The genetics of Rubus is extremely complex, so that it is difficult to decide on which groups should be recognized as species. There are many rare species with limited ranges such as this. Further study is suggested to clarify the taxonomy.

References

tygartensis
Plants described in 1953
Flora of West Virginia
Flora without expected TNC conservation status